Brotherhoods (bratstva; literally, "fraternities") were the unions of Eastern Orthodox citizens or lay brothers affiliated with individual churches in the cities throughout the Ruthenian part of the Polish–Lithuanian Commonwealth such as Lviv, Wilno, Lutsk, Vitebsk, Minsk, and Kyiv. Their structure resembled that of Western medieval confraternities and trade guilds.

The Orthodox brotherhoods, first documented in 1463 (Lviv Dormition Brotherhood), were consolidated in the aftermath of the Union of Brest (1596) in order to oppose the conversion of Orthodox Christians to the Eastern Catholic Churches, the Counter-Reformation, and both real and imagined Polonization. The brotherhoods attempted to resist state-supported Catholic missionary activity by publishing books in the Cyrillic script and by financing a network of Orthodox schools which offered education in both Old Church Slavonic and the Ruthenian language. The famous Kyiv Mohyla Academy grew out of one such school under the umbrella of the Brotherhood Monastery in Kyiv. The Dormition Church, Lviv was financed by the  brotherhood of the same name; its members also supported the Cossack risings in the east of Ukraine. The powerful Ostrogski family provided political support for their activities.

The activity of the Orthodox fraternities helped preserve the national culture of Ukraine and Belarus throughout the Counter-Reformation era. Most were closed in the course of the 18th century when Greek-Catholic proselytism had been forbidden by the House of Romanov. Some were revived in the late 19th century in order to stem "atheist propaganda" of the Nihilists. The Brotherhood of Saints Cyril and Methodius promoted national awareness, helping the Ukrainians of Imperial Russia discover their national identity. The Ostrog bratstvo was reinstituted by Countess Bludova, an ardent admirer of the Ostrogski family.

See also 
 History of Christianity in Ukraine
 Confraternity
 Lviv Dormition Brotherhood

References

External links
 Brotherhoods at the Encyclopedia of Ukraine

Anti-Catholicism in Eastern Orthodoxy
Eastern Orthodoxy in Ukraine
Eastern Orthodoxy in Belarus
16th-century Christianity
Ruthenians in the Polish–Lithuanian Commonwealth
History of Christianity in Ukraine
Confraternities
Eastern Orthodox lay societies
Brotherhood (Orthodox lay societies)